Patrician Marco Doria, Marquis and Count of Montaldeo (born 13 October 1957) is an Italian academic and politician from Genoa.  He served as Mayor of Genoa from 2012 to 2017.

Biography 
Doria is a descendant of the Genoese ancient and noble family Doria.  He studied at the University of Genoa and the European University Institute.  He became a professor of economic history at the University of Genoa.

Doria was elected mayor of Genoa on 21 May 2012 and held office till 2017.

Bibliography

References

1957 births
Academic staff of the University of Genoa
Mayors of Genoa
Living people
Marco
Left Ecology Freedom politicians